Uini Atonio (born 26 March 1990) is a New-Zealand-born French professional rugby union player, who plays as a tighthead prop for French Top 14 club La Rochelle and the France national team.

Born in New Zealand to Samoan parents, he qualified for France through residency having lived in Charente-Maritime since 2011 and his move to La Rochelle.

Early life
He started playing rugby union in his hometown at the age of five for amateur club Harlequins RFC. In 2000, he moved to Auckland with his family and attended Wesley College in Pukekohe before joining Counties Manukau at sixteen years old where he stayed until 2011.

At his time at Wesley College, his older brother Vau and he did theatre and were part of the Black Friars, the school's company which performed Shakespeare's plays. After being released by Counties Manukau, he did a few professional theatrical performances to make a little money.

Club career
On 1 July 2011, Atonio joined French club La Rochelle after then-head coach Patrice Collazo spotted him at a rugby tens tournament in Hong Kong in 2010. Shortly after his arrival in France, he played his first professional game for the club during the 2011–12 Pro D2 season. After having played fourteen games in his first season, he played twenty nine matches in his second and then thirty in his third season at the end of which he was integral to La Rochelle promotion into the Top 14 in 2014, becaming a cornerstone of the team.

On 16 August 2014, he played his very first Top 14 game against Brive in a 37–15 away loss.

In the 2020–21 season, he reached the Champions Cup and Top 14 finals but lost both games against Toulouse after losing the 2018–19 Challenge Cup final two years earlier.

On 28 May 2022, he led La Rochelle to an epic 21-24 win against Leinster in the 2021–22 European Rugby Champions Cup final at Stade Vélodrome in Marseille, playing more than sixty minutes and earning his first major trophy with the club.

International career
Born in New Zealand to Samoan parents, Atonio was eligible to play for both New Zealand and Samoa. He later qualified for France through residency having lived in La Rochelle since 2011.

In 2009, he was named in the Samoa U20 squad for the 2009 IRB Junior World Championship in Japan and was the heaviest player in the tournament.

In 2014, he was called up to the France national team for the 2014 Autumn internationals after completing the required three years of residency and made his debut on 8 November in a 40–15 win over Fiji in Marseille. He was then included in the France squad for the 2015 Six Nations Championship and the 2015 Rugby World Cup a year later, as well as for the 2016, 2017 and 2018 Six Nations Championships.

In 2022, Atonio was included in the squad for the 2022 Six Nations Championship, played in all five games as a starter and won the first French Grand Slam since 2010 after finishing in second place a year ago.

International tries

Honours

La Rochelle
 European Rugby Champions Cup: 2021–22
 European Rugby Champions Cup runner-up: 2020–21
 European Rugby Challenge Cup runner-up: 2018-19
 Top 14 runner-up: 2020-21

France
 Six Nations Championship: 2022
 Six Nations Championship runner-up: 2021, 2023

References

External links
 France Rugby
 EPCR
 All.Rugby
 It's Rugby

1990 births
Living people
Rugby union players from Timaru
French rugby union players
France international rugby union players
Stade Rochelais players
New Zealand rugby union players
New Zealand emigrants to France
French people of Samoan descent
New Zealand sportspeople of Samoan descent
Rugby union props